The Chancellery of the President of the Republic of Poland, instituted in 1989, is a governmental institution composed of the immediate staff of the President of Poland that assists and is governed by the President. The objective of the Chancellery is to provide assistance to the President in its multiple echelons of staff, which include the Presidential cabinet and the Chancellery of National Security. The Chief of the Chancellery (Szef Kancelarii) heads the institution; the Chief is appointed by and immediately responsible to the President.

Chiefs of the Chancellery 

 Michał Janiszewski (September 1989 – December 21, 1990) – under President Wojciech Jaruzelski
 Jarosław Kaczyński (December 22, 1990 – October 31, 1991) – Lech Wałęsa
 Janusz Ziółkowski (November 1, 1991 – May 11, 1995) – Lech Wałęsa
 Tomasz Kwiatkowski (May 11, 1995 – August 12, 1995) – Lech Wałęsa
 Stanisław Iwanicki (August 21, 1995 – December 22, 1995) – Lech Wałęsa
 Danuta Waniek (December 23, 1995 – December 2, 1997) – Aleksander Kwaśniewski
 Danuta Hübner (December 2, 1997 – November 13, 1998) – Aleksander Kwaśniewski
 Ryszard Kalisz (November 13, 1998 – June 13, 2000) – Aleksander Kwaśniewski
 Jolanta Szymanek-Deresz (June 13, 2000 – October 18, 2005) – Aleksander Kwaśniewski
 Edward Szymański (acting, October 18, 2005 – December 22, 2005) – Aleksander Kwaśniewski
 Andrzej Urbański (December 23, 2005 – June 2, 2006) – Lech Kaczyński
 Robert Draba (acting, June 2, 2006 – August 2, 2006) – Lech Kaczyński
 Aleksander Szczygło (August 2, 2006 – February 7, 2007) – Lech Kaczyński
 Robert Draba (acting, February 7, 2007 – November 29, 2007) – Lech Kaczyński
 Anna Fotyga (November 29, 2007 – August 20, 2008) – Lech Kaczyński
 Piotr Kownacki (acting August 20, 2008 – September 4, 2008) – Lech Kaczyński
 Piotr Kownacki (September 4, 2008 – July 27, 2009) – Lech Kaczyński
 Władysław Stasiak (July 27, 2009 – April 10, 2010) – Lech Kaczyński
 Jacek Michałowski (acting, April 11, 2010 – July 7, 2010) – Bronisław Komorowski (acting President)
 Jacek Michałowski (July 7, 2010 – August 5, 2015) – Bronisław Komorowski (acting President), Bogdan Borusewicz (acting President), Grzegorz Schetyna (acting President), and Bronisław Komorowski
 Małgorzata Sadurska (since August 7, 2015) – Andrzej Duda

Chiefs of the Cabinet 

 Krzysztof Pusz (December 22, 1990 – October 29, 1991) – Lech Wałęsa
 Mieczysław Wachowski (October 29, 1991 – August 25, 1995) – Lech Wałęsa
 Marek Ungier (December 23, 1995 – December 30, 2004) – Aleksander Kwaśniewski
 Waldemar Dubaniowski (January 20, 2005 – December 22, 2005) – Aleksander Kwaśniewski
 Elżbieta Jakubiak (December 23, 2005 – July 23, 2007) – Lech Kaczyński
 Maciej Łopiński (July 23, 2007 – April 10, 2010) – Lech Kaczyński
 Maciej Łopiński (April 10, 2010 – July 6, 2010) – Bronisław Komorowski (acting President)
 Paweł Lisiewicz (September 5, 2013 – August 5, 2015) – Bronisław Komorowski
 Adam Kwiatkowski (August 7, 2015 – April 4, 2017) – Andrzej Duda
 Krzysztof Szczerski (April 4, 2017 – January 4, 2021) – Andrzej Duda
 Paweł Szrot (January 5, 2021 – ) – Andrzej Duda

External links 
 Official Presidential Site

Government of Poland